The Bartonian is, in the ICS's geologic time scale, a stage or age in the middle Eocene Epoch or Series. It is preceded by the Lutetian and is followed by the Priabonian Age.

Stratigraphic definition
The Bartonian Stage was introduced by Swiss stratigrapher Karl Mayer-Eymar in 1857. The name derives from the coastal village Barton-on-Sea (part of New Milton) in southern England. The Barton Group, a lithostratigraphic unit from the south English Hampshire Basin, is of Bartonian age. The distinction between group and stage was made in the second part of the 20th century, when stratigraphers saw the need to distinguish between litho- and chronostratigraphy.

The base of the Bartonian is at the first appearance of the calcareous nanoplankton species Reticulofenestra reticulata. In 2009, an official reference profile (GSSP) for the base of the Bartonian had not yet been established.

The top of the Bartonian Stage (the base of the Priabonian) is at the first appearance of calcareous nanoplankton species Chiasmolithus oamaruensis (which forms the base of nanoplankton biozone NP18).

The Bartonian Stage overlaps part of the upper Robiacian European Land Mammal Mega Zone (it spans the Mammal Paleogene zone 16), the upper Uintan and Duchesnean North American Land Mammal Ages, part of the Divisaderan South American Land Mammal Age and is coeval with the Sharamururian Asian Land Mammal Age. 

The Auversian regional stage of France is coeval with the Bartonian and is therefore no longer used.

References

Footnotes

Literature

; 2004: A Geologic Time Scale 2004, Cambridge University Press.
; 1857: Tableau synchronique des formations tertiaires d'Europe, 3rd ed., Zürich.

External links
GeoWhen Database – Bartonian
Paleogene timescale, at the website of the subcommission for stratigraphic information of the ICS
Stratigraphic chart of the Paleogene, at the website of Norges Network of offshore records of geology and stratigraphy

 
Eocene geochronology
 
Geological ages